Dholpur is one of the 200 Legislative Assembly constituencies of Rajasthan state in India. It is in Dholpur district and is a segment of the Karauli-Dholpur (Lok Sabha constituency).

Members of assembly
 1972 : Banwari Lal Sharma (Indian National Congress)
 1977 : Banwari Lal Sharma (Indian National Congress)
 1980 : Banwari Lal Sharma (Indian National Congress)
 1985 : Vasundhara Raje (Bharatiya Janata Party)
 1990 : Bhairon Singh Shekhawat (BJP)
 1993 : Banwari Lal Sharma (Indian National Congress) 
 2003 : Banwari Lal Sharma (Indian National Congress)
 2013 : B L Kushwah (Bahujan Samaj Party)

Election results

2018 Vidhan Sabha

2017 Bypoll

2013 Vidhan Sabha

See also
List of constituencies of the Rajasthan Legislative Assembly
Dholpur district

References

Dholpur district
Assembly constituencies of Rajasthan